Pen taluka is a taluka in Raigad district of the Indian state of Maharashtra.

Raigad district
As of August 2015, there were 8 sub-divisions, 15 talukas, 1970 villages, 60 revenue circled and 350 sazzas in Raigad district. The talukas being Alibag, Karjat, Khalapur, Mahad, Mangaon, Mhasala, Murud, Panvel, Pen, Poladpur, Roha, Shrivardhan, Sudhagad Pali, Tala and Uran.

References

Talukas in Maharashtra
Talukas in Raigad district